Elke Blumauer (born 23 July 1963) is a German handball player who played for the West German national team. She was born in  Offenbach am Main. She represented West Germany at the 1984 Summer Olympics in Los Angeles, where the West German team placed fourth.

References

1963 births
Living people
Sportspeople from Offenbach am Main
German female handball players
Olympic handball players of West Germany
Handball players at the 1984 Summer Olympics